Heathrow station could refer to one of a number of stations serving London Heathrow Airport.

London Underground stations:
 Heathrow Terminals 2 & 3 tube station
 Heathrow Terminal 4 tube station
 Heathrow Terminal 5 station
National Rail stations:
 Heathrow Terminals 2 & 3 railway station
 Heathrow Terminal 4 railway station
 Heathrow Hub railway station, a proposed station to serve as a transport hub for the airport
 Heathrow Junction railway station, a temporary station used during 1998